Charaxes prettejohni is a butterfly in the family Nymphalidae. It is found in Tanzania, from the north-western part of the country to the Geita District.

Description
See Mark C. Williams 2021  Afrotropical Butterflies Nymphalidae, Charaxinae, Genus Charaxes

Etymology
The species is named for Mike Prettejohn.

References

External links
Charaxes prettejohni images at Consortium for the Barcode of Life

Butterflies described in 1990
prettejohni
Endemic fauna of Tanzania
Butterflies of Africa